is a multi-directional shooter arcade video game that was released by Namco in 1980. The only direct home conversion is for the MSX, and in 1985 a similar game release is Battle City for the Family Computer. Tank Battalion received a sequel called Tank Force, for arcades in 1991.

Gameplay

The player, controlling a tank, must destroy twenty enemy tanks in each round, which enter the playfield from the top of the screen. The enemy tanks attempt to destroy the player's base (represented on the map as an eagle) as well as the player tank itself. A round is cleared when the player destroys all twenty enemy tanks, but the game ends if the player's base is destroyed or he runs out of lives.

Reception
Cash Box believed that "the real excitement" of Tank Battalion lied within its ability to modify the level design by destroying the brick walls.

Retrospectively in 2015, a writer for Beep! enjoyed the Sord M5 version for its improvements over the arcade original, such as the smoother movement of the player's tank, but disliked the squashed-looking graphics and narrow playing space. While the writer believed the MSX version was superior, they still recommended the M5 version for Namco fans and collectors.

Legacy 
A theme based on the game for Pac-Man 99 was released as free post-launch DLC, featuring visuals and sounds from the game.

Notes

References

External links

1980 video games
Arcade video games
Bandai Namco Entertainment franchises
Multidirectional shooters
Namco arcade games
MSX games
Tank simulation video games
Video games developed in Japan